Comcast Hometown Network (CHN) is American cable television network owned by the Comcast Corporation that operates in the San Francisco Bay Area of California. It is available to over 2 million homes.

References

Comcast
Television stations in the San Francisco Bay Area